MMS19 nucleotide excision repair protein homolog is a protein that in humans is encoded by the MMS19 gene.

References

Further reading